Silica is a village and municipality in the Rožňava District in the Košice Region of middle-eastern Slovakia.

History
In historical records the village was first mentioned in 1399.

The locality was annexed by the Kingdom of Hungary after the arbitration of Vienna on 1938-11-02. In 1938, there were  inhabitants whose 4 was Jewish origin. It was part of the district of Rožňava. The name of the locality before the World War II was Silica/Szilice. During 1938 and 1945, the Hungarian name Szilice was used. After the liberation, the municipality has been reinstated in the reconstituted Czechoslovak Republic.

Geography
The village lies at an elevation of 546 metres and covers an area of 34.565 km².
It has a population of about 590 people.

Culture
The village has a public library and a football pitch.

References

External links
http://www.statistics.sk/mosmis/eng/run.html
 Silica

Villages and municipalities in Rožňava District